The Cibao Marl is a geologic formation in Puerto Rico.

It preserves fossils dating back to the Neogene period.

See also

 List of fossiliferous stratigraphic units in Puerto Rico

References
 

Neogene Puerto Rico
Geologic formations of Puerto Rico